Elections to Portsmouth City Council were held on 3 May 2007.  One third of the council was up for election and the council stayed under no overall control.

After the election, the composition of the council was:
Liberal Democrat 19
Conservative 17
Labour 5
Independent 1

Election result

Ward results

Baffins

Central Southsea

Charles Dickens

Copnor

Cosham

Drayton and Farlington

Eastney and Craneswater

Fratton

Hilsea

Milton

Nelson

Paulsgrove

St Jude

St Thomas

References
2007 Portsmouth election result
Ward results 
Portsmouth: Lib Dems hang on

2007
2007 English local elections
2000s in Hampshire